John Ratcliffe (born John Sicklemore; 1549 – December 1609) was an early Jamestown colonist, mariner and captain of , the smallest of three ships (the other two being Susan Constant and Godspeed) that sailed from the Kingdom of England on 19 December 1606, to English-claimed Virginia to found a colony, arriving 26 April 1607. He later became the second president of the colony of Jamestown. He was killed by the Pamunkey Native Americans in late 1609.

Biography
Sicklemore was born in Lancashire. In early life, he changed his name to Ratcliffe as an alias. He served as a seaman before going to Virginia, and he may be the Captain Ratcliffe taken prisoner with Sir Henry Cary, 1st Viscount Falkland and Captain Piggot, at Mülheim, in 1605.

Virginia colony
Ratcliffe commanded Discovery and became a councillor of the Jamestown Colony. Discovery was the smallest of all three ships; it had a crew of only 21 men. He became president of the colony upon the deposition of Edward Maria Wingfield on 10 September 1607. Ratcliffe fell out of favour with many colonists after enlisting men to build a governor's house. Many colonists also disagreed with how he handled trade with the natives and how he performed during the food shortages during the summer of 1608. Ratcliffe was removed in July 1608 and succeeded by Matthew Scrivener. During the administration of George Percy, Ratcliffe was sent in October 1609 to build a fort at Old Point Comfort, which was named "Algenourne Fort" after one of Percy's ancestors. Ratcliffe had been sick in the first summer of Jamestown, and never recovered to the change of climate.

Ratcliffe worked with explorer John Smith to remove Edward Wingfield from the presidency because he was hiding food for himself that the colony needed. Ratcliffe was elected president and asked Smith to organise work details and expeditions to trade with Native Americans. By January 1608, only 38 colonists were alive, and Ratcliffe and the Council planned to return to England on Discovery. Ratcliffe's overgenerous trading provoked Smith to complain that they would soon run out of items to trade. Ratcliffe left office (either by resignation or deposition) in July 1608, two months before the end of his term. The colonists were also enraged that as they were sick and dying, Ratcliffe ordered they build a capitol in the woods. The colonists dubbed the project "Ratcliffe's Palace." Ratcliffe accompanied Christopher Newport when he sailed from Virginia in 1608. In May 1609, he commanded  Diamond, one of the ships in the Third Supply fleet of Sir Thomas Gates.

Death
During The Starving Time in December 1609 or early 1610, Ratcliffe and 25 fellow colonists were invited to a gathering with a large group of Powhatan Indians.  The Englishmen were promised they would be given corn in return for copper, but it was a trap. The colonists were given food baskets that were nearly empty, the Powhatan Indians ambushed them, and Ratcliffe was taken to the village. Only two colonists escaped. Ratcliffe suffered a particularly gruesome fate: he was tied to a stake in front of a fire. Women removed the skin from his entire body with mussel shells and tossed the pieces into the flame as he watched. They skinned his face last and finally burned him at the stake. This story was documented in an eyewitness account that is included in The Jamestown Adventure: Accounts of the Virginia Colony, 1605–1614 (Real Voices, Real History), edited by Ed Southern (published 2004). How this account only surfaced in 2004 is unknown. He was given the nickname Luckless Captain Ratcliffe.

In popular culture
In Disney's Pocahontas (1995), Ratcliffe was portrayed as a greedy and ruthlessly ambitious man, and the film's main antagonist. His character believes that the Powhatan tribe is very barbaric and has hidden gold near the outskirts of Virginia. He wants to battle the Native Americans for it, despite the fact that there was never any gold in Virginia. Here, he was voiced by David Ogden Stiers, who gave him a Mid-Atlantic accent. In this adaptation, he is accompanied by the pug Percy (this name is derived from the English colonist George Percy) and by his servant Wiggins (also voiced by Stiers). He also appeared in the direct-to-video sequel Pocahontas II: Journey to a New World (1998), where he plans to dupe King James I into allowing him to send a large navy armada to perpetrate a genocide against the Powhatans by attempting to sabotage the diplomatic meetings between Pocahontas and the king. He is finally exposed for his incompetence and treachery and is imprisoned by King James.

Notes

References
Jamestown https://web.archive.org/web/20091223060121/http://historyisfun.org/index.htm
Beaufort County Court House, 112 W Second St, Washington, NC 27889-1403, Public Records, Log of Transactions
Raymond F. Dolle, "Captain John Smith's Satire of Sir Walter Raleigh"
David Morenus, "The Real Pocahontas"
"Virginia Records Timeline: 1553–1743", United States Library of Congress Thomas Jefferson Papers
Price, David A., Love and Hate in Jamestown: John Smith, Pocahontas, and the Start of a New Nation (New York: Knopf, 2003)
Property Records from Beaufort County Courthouse, North Carolina
  The Jamestown Adventure: Accounts of the Virginia Colony, 1605–1614 (Real Voices, Real History) by Ed Southern (Editor)  (Winston-Salem NC: Blair, 2004)

1549 births
1609 deaths
Colonial governors of Virginia
English sailors
English explorers
17th-century explorers
16th-century English people
17th-century English people
17th-century American people
John
Executed politicians
People executed by flaying
People executed by burning
People from Jamestown, Virginia